Emerald – Musical Gems is the ninth studio album released by the group Celtic Woman.

Background
Emerald – Musical Gems was released worldwide on 25 February 2014. The album features vocalists Chloë Agnew, Susan McFadden, Lisa Lambe, and fiddler Máiréad Nesbitt. Agnew had left the group prior to the release of this album, making it the last to feature her as a principal performer until she returned as a guest performer for 2021's Postcards from Ireland. Unlike previous releases, while classified as a studio album, the track listing of Emerald – Musical Gems consists of re-recordings of songs previously covered by the group.

An accompanying concert special of the same title, recorded live at the Morris Performing Arts Center, South Bend, Indiana, United States in April 2013, was also released on DVD and Blu-ray in conjunction with the album, and aired on PBS stations across the United States in March 2014.

Track listing

Notes
 "Dúlaman" contains portions of "An Cailín Álainn", a traditional Irish sean-nós song.

Charts
The album debuted at  No. 29 on the Billboard 200 albums chart on its first week of release, with around 10,000 copies sold in the United States. It also debuted at No. 1 on the Billboard World Albums chart and No. 3 on the Independent Albums charts. As of December 2015, the album has sold 73,000 copies in the country.

References

Celtic Woman albums
2014 live albums
2014 video albums
Manhattan Records albums